Bélesta is a commune, situated on the Hers-Vif river in the Ariège department of southwestern France.

History
Situated in the valley of the Hers-Vif, Bélesta is known for its fir tree forest, which was a former royal forest whose wood was used to construct the mast of ships. 1 km upstream from the village is a spring, created by a significant surge of water from the Karst Plateau de Sault.

Population

See also
Communes of the Ariège department

References

Communes of Ariège (department)
Ariège communes articles needing translation from French Wikipedia